The Women's 200 metre backstroke event at the 2013 Southeast Asian Games took place on 12 December 2013 at Wunna Theikdi Aquatics Centre.

There were 6 competitors from 4 countries who took part in this event. No Qualification was held since only 6 swimmers competed.

Schedule
All times are Myanmar Standard Time (UTC+06:30)

Records

Results

Final

References

External links

Swimming at the 2013 Southeast Asian Games
2013 in women's swimming